Tricontinental is a left-wing quarterly magazine founded after the Tricontinental Conference 1966. The magazine is the official publication of the Organization of Solidarity with the People of Asia, Africa and Latin America (OSPAAAL) which also published it until 2019. It has its headquarters in Havana.

History and overview 

From the founding of Tricontinental in August 1967 until the dissolution of the Soviet Union, which led to a rapid recession in the Cuban economy, propaganda posters were folded up and placed inside copies of the magazine, however, this was stopped, along with publication of Tricontinental, due to ink shortages and financial trouble.

Tricontinental began to be printed again in 1995. In 2000, the decision was made to begin to reprint posters. Production of these materials ceased with the OSPAAAL's closure in 2019.

The magazine is distributed around the world, and at its height, 87 countries received Tricontinental, and there were more than 100,000 subscribers, mostly students. At one time, it was very common for posters from issues of Tricontinental to be posted on the walls of student community centres.

See also
Towards the Third Cinema, a manifesto published in 1969 by Tricontinental
Tricontinental: Institute for Social Research

References

Further reading
Anne Garland Mahler,

External links
Official site (in English)
Official site (in Spanish)
WorldCat record

Magazines published in Cuba
Magazines established in 1967
Mass media in Havana
Political magazines
Quarterly magazines
Spanish-language magazines
Socialist magazines
Third-Worldism